Tihomir Kostadinov (born 4 March 1996) is a Macedonian midfielder who plays for Ekstraklasa club Piast Gliwice.

Club career

Moravac
Born in Macedonian town of Valandovo, Kostadinov made his professional debut by playing in neighboring Serbia, with Moravac Mrštane in the 2014–15 Serbian First League, Serbian second level.

FC ViOn Zlaté Moravce - Vráble
Kostadinov made his Fortuna Liga debut for ViOn Zlaté Moravce in a 1:2 loss against Spartak Myjava on 16 July 2016. He debuted directly in the starting XI.

International career
He made his senior debut for North Macedonia in a November 2019 European Championship qualification match against Austria.

References

External links
 
 Fortuna Liga profile
 
 Eurofotbal profile

1996 births
Living people
People from Valandovo
Association football midfielders
Macedonian footballers
North Macedonia youth international footballers
North Macedonia under-21 international footballers
North Macedonia international footballers
FK Moravac Mrštane players
FK Teteks players
FK Dukla Banská Bystrica players
FC ViOn Zlaté Moravce players
MFK Ružomberok players
Piast Gliwice players
Serbian First League players
Macedonian First Football League players
Slovak Super Liga players
Ekstraklasa players
UEFA Euro 2020 players
Macedonian expatriate footballers
Expatriate footballers in Serbia
Expatriate footballers in Slovakia
Expatriate footballers in Poland
Macedonian expatriate sportspeople in Serbia
Macedonian expatriate sportspeople in Slovakia
Macedonian expatriate sportspeople in Poland